Lovedsolved is the fourth studio album by Svoy. It was released on May 27, 2014, on Songs of Universal/Universal Music Group, Inc. The album was in production for over 7 years with five selections having become part of Svoy's Solved EP (2012) and the other four part of Lovedso EP (2014), eventually making it to the album.

Track listing

Personnel 
 Svoy – keyboards, vocals, producer, programming, vocal arrangement, keytar solo, sound engineering, mixing, mastering, art direction, design
 Shervin Lainez – photography

Release history

References 

2014 albums
Svoy albums